Jeffrey Perry (born August 16, 1955) is an American actor of stage, television, and film. He is known for his role as Richard Katimski on the teen drama My So-Called Life, Thatcher Grey on the medical drama series Grey's Anatomy, Cyrus Beene on the political drama series Scandal, all for ABC, and as Inspector Harvey Leek on the CBS crime drama Nash Bridges. He currently stars on the ABC drama Alaska Daily, alongside Hilary Swank.

Career
Perry is a co-founder of the Steppenwolf Theatre Company in Chicago. He and schoolmates Gary Sinise and Terry Kinney started the company in one end of the cafeteria at Highland Park High School and later moved it to a small space in the Immaculate Conception Church in Highland Park. It has since grown into a notable national theater company whose alumni include John Malkovich, John Mahoney, and Joan Allen. Perry remains an executive artistic director along with co-founders Kinney and Sinise.

After spending nearly two decades with Steppenwolf, Perry moved to Los Angeles in 1987 to pursue film and television work. Perry perhaps is best known as San Francisco Police Department inspector Harvey Leek (a diehard Grateful Dead fan) on the CBS police drama series Nash Bridges. He was a tough superior to Kevin Bacon's detective in the thriller Wild Things (1998). His many television and film credits include The Human Stain (2003), Hard Promises (1991) and The Grifters (1990) as well as appearances on My So-Called Life (1994), The West Wing (2003), The Practice (2003), Lost (2005), Cold Case (2006), Raines (2007), and several episodes of Grey's Anatomy (2005) as Meredith Grey's father, Thatcher Grey. He replaced John Billingsley in the role of Terrence Steadman in the critically acclaimed TV show Prison Break.

Perry also has been in multiple stage productions. These include Time of your Life (in San Francisco and Seattle), Grapes of Wrath (Broadway and London), and The Caretaker (Broadway). He starred in the Tracy Letts play August: Osage County on Broadway, which originated at Steppenwolf Theatre in Chicago. In 2012, he appeared Off Broadway playing Christopher, the aggressive father in Tribes by Nina Raine.

From 2012 to 2018, Perry starred in the ABC drama series Scandal as Cyrus Beene.

In 2015, Perry performed alongside his daughter Zoe Perry and actor Kevin McKidd in Eugene O'Neill's Pulitzer Prize-winning drama Anna Christie at the Odyssey Theatre Ensemble in West Los Angeles. During the production, he said "During Anna Christie the biggest challenge I had was working with my daughter and sort of not stopping and asking an audience member for a camera to record the moment."

In 2022-23, Perry starred as editor Stanley Kornik in the ABC drama series Alaska Daily.

Personal life
Perry was born in Highland Park, Illinois, where his father was a teacher at Highland Park High School. He graduated from Illinois State University in 1978. In 2011, Perry received an honorary doctorate from Illinois State University in recognition of his extraordinary contributions to the field of theatre.

Perry was married to actress Laurie Metcalf from 1983 until 1986. They had a child, actress Zoe Perry, together in 1983, but they subsequently divorced. In 1989, he married Linda Lowy, Grey's Anatomys casting director, with whom he has a daughter, Leah Perry.

Filmography

Remember My Name (1978) as Harry 
A Wedding (1978) as Bunky Lemay
Say Goodnight, Gracie (1983)
Tales from the Hollywood Hills: Closed Set (1988) as Bud
Three Fugitives (1989) as Orderly Two 
Family Ties as David Simmons (1 episode, 1989) 
Columbo: Murder, Smoke, and Shadows as Leonard Fisher (1989) 
Roe vs. Wade (1989) 
The Final Days (1989) as Staffer
The Grifters (1990) as Drunk 
Shannon's Deal (1 episode, 1990) 
Equal Justice as ADA Warren (1 episode, 1990) 
The Flash as Charlie (1 episode, 1990) 
thirtysomething as David Hall (2 episodes, 1989-1991)
American Playhouse as Noah Joad (1 episode, 1991) 
Brooklyn Bridge as Joel Jacobson (2 episodes, 1991) 
Civil Wars (1 episode, 1991) 
Hard Promises (1991) as Pinky
Life on the Edge (1992) as Ray Nelson
Storyville (1992) as Peter Dandridge
A Private Matter (1992) as Randall Everett 
Casualties of Love: The Long Island Lolita Story (1993) as Amy's Attorney
Murder in the Heartland (1993) as Earl Heflin 
L.A. Law as Jonah Burgee (3 episodes, 1993) 
Naked Instinct (1993) as Frat Boy
Body of Evidence (1993) as Gabe
Playmaker (1994) .... Allen 
My So-Called Life as Richard Katimski (4 episodes, 1994-1995) 
Kingfish: A Story of Huey P. Long (1995) as Earl Long
Chicago Hope as Gilbert Weeks (3 episodes, 1995) 
American Gothic as Artie Healy (1 episode, 1996) 
Into Thin Air: Death on Everest (1997) as Doug Hansen
Wild Things (1998) as Bryce Hunter 
Lansky (1999) as American Lawyer
Nash Bridges as Insp. Harvey Leek (122 episodes, 1996-2001) 
Frasier as John Clayton (1 episode, 2002) 
NYPD Blue as Gordon Dillit (1 episode, 2003) 
The Human Stain (2003) as Tennis Player 
ER as Officer Mitch Palnick (1 episode, 2003) 
The District as Lemma (1 episode, 2003) 
The West Wing as Burt Ganz (1 episode, 2003) 
The Practice as Randy Markham (1 episode, 2003) 
Lost as Frank Duckett (1 episode, 2005) 
Law & Order: Trial by Jury as Andrew Soin (1 episode, 2005) 
Numb3rs as Morton Standbury (1 episode, 2005) 
Invasion as Terrence Gale (1 episode, 2005) 
Close to Home as Uncle Bill (1 episode, 2005) 
Cold Case as Eric Witt (1 episode, 2006) 
Crossing Jordan as Kyle Everett (1 episode, 2006) 
The Valley of Light (2007) as Taylor Bowers 
Prison Break as Terrence Steadman (3 episodes, 2006-2007) 
Raines as Harry Tucker (1 episode, 2007) 
The Last Supper: 13 Men of Courage (2007) as Bartholomew
Side Order of Life as Reno (1 episode, 2007) 
American Dad! as Nicholas Dawson (2 episodes, 2007, 2017) 
Diminished Capacity (2008) as Casey Dean
Saving Grace as Det. Walter Eckley (1 episode, 2009) 
Eleventh Hour as Doctor Mal Sheppard (1 episode, 2009) 
Fringe as Joseph Slater (1 episode, 2009)
CSI: NY as Judge (1 episode, 2010) 
CSI: Crime Scene Investigation as George Stark / (2 episodes, 2003-2010) 
Outsourced" (1 episode, 2010) 
Grey's Anatomy as Thatcher Grey (15 episodes, 2006-2019) 
Picture Paris (2011) as Keith 
The Anniversary at Shallow Creek (2011) as Cashier
The Chicago Code as David Argyle (1 episode, 2011) 
Scandal as Cyrus Beene (2012–2018) 
Lizzie (2018) as Andrew Jennings
Trial by Fire (2018) as Hurst
Dirty John (2018) as Michael O'Neil
Inventing Anna (2022) as Lou
Alaska Daily (2022) as Stanley

References

External links
 
 
 Jeff Perry at Internet Off-Broadway Database
 The Steppenwolf Theater Company

1955 births
Living people
20th-century American male actors
21st-century American male actors
Male actors from Chicago
American male film actors
American male stage actors
American male television actors
Drama Desk Award winners
Illinois State University alumni
People from Highland Park, Illinois
Steppenwolf Theatre Company players